Utada United 2006 was a Japanese concert tour by Japanese-American singer-songwriter Hikaru Utada. It was Utada's second concert tour of Japan following her Bohemian Summer 2000 tour. A live DVD of the tour was released on December 20, 2006.

Overview 

During the filmed concert, Utada wore 4 different outfits. The first outfit worn was a long, tattered, black and white outfit(which seemingly resembled a wedding dress), with pieces of cloth that hung a little above her ankles. Near the shoulders, this dress seemed to puff out, or become feather-like. She sang her first 7 songs in this outfit. Then she wore a leather-like coat, that resembled a ballroom gown from the waist down. She sang her Exodus songs in this dress. When looked at closely, you can see that underneath it was the next outfit, which was a red dress. It had strips near the shoulders, and allowed her to move more, A feature which was helpful in performances like Can You Keep a Secret? and Wait & See ~Risk~. She sang the next 8 songs in this particular outfit. The last outfit, which was very light compared to the rest, had a small blue skirt and a light pink top. In this outfit, she sang her last 2 songs, Automatic and Hikari. In some of early performances, she substituted the pink top with a black blouse. Underneath all of the outfits was a black sleeve-less leotard and black knee high boots with wedge heels. The concerts at the Saitama Super Arena attracted about 18,000 spectators each.

Set list 
Main set

 Opening (Exodus opening track)
 Passion
 This Is Love
 Traveling
 Movin' On Without You
 Sakura Drops
 Final Distance
 First Love
 Untitled (Video interlude)
 Devil Inside
 Kremlin Dusk
 You Make Me Want to Be a Man
 Be My Last
 Dareka no Negai ga Kanau Koro
 Colors
 Can You Keep a Secret?
 Addicted to You
 Wait & See (Risk)
 Letters
 Keep Tryin'
 Automatic
 Hikari

Tour dates

References 

2006 concert tours
Hikaru Utada concert tours
Albums recorded at Saitama Super Arena